Vida means “life” in Spanish and Portuguese. It may refer to:

Geography
 Vida (Gradačac), village in Bosnia and Herzegovina
 Lake Vida, Victoria Valley, Antarctica
 U.S. settled places:
 Vida, Montana
 Vida, Oregon
 Vida, Missouri

Film and TV
 Vida TV, a television channel in Venezuela
 Vida (TV series), a 2018 American television series

Literature
 Vida (Occitan literary form), a medieval literary genre
 Vida (novel), a 1980 novel by Marge Piercy
 Vida: Women in Literary Arts, a non-profit feminist organization

Music

Albums
 Vida (Sui Generis album), 1972
 Vida, a 1980 album by Chico Buarque
 Vida, a 1988 album by Paloma San Basilio
 Vida, a 1989 album by DC3
 Vida, a 1990 album by Emmanuel
 Vida!..., a 1993 album by Kon Kan
 Vida (La Mafia album), 1994
 Vida, a 1996 album by Marcos Llunas
 Vida, a 2002 album by Del Castillo
 Vida, a 2002 album by Santiago Feliú
 Vida, a 2003 album by Tazenda
 Vida, a 2010 album by Tito Rojas
 Vida (Draco Rosa album), 2013
 Vida (Fuego album), 2014
 Vida (Luis Fonsi album), 2019
 La Vida, Ainhoa Arteta 2009

Songs
 "Vida" (Ricardo Arjona song), 2010
 "Vida" (Ricky Martin song), 2014
 "Vída", a 2011 song by Alexander Acha from La Vída Es... Amor Sincero
 "Vida", a 1980 song by Celia Cruz, Johnny Pacheco and Pete "El Conde" Rodríguez from Celia/Johnny/Pete
 "Vida", a 1983 song by Chico Buarque
 "Vida", a 2002 song by Del Castillo from Vida
 "Vida", a 1981 song by Gilberto Gil
 "Vida", a 2001 song by Julio Iglesias from Ao Meu Brasil
 "Vida", a 1994 song by La Mafia from Vida
 "Vida", a 2010 song by Marc Anthony from Iconos
 "Vida", a 2012 song by Max Herre from Hallo Welt!
 "Vida", a 1966 song by Ray Barretto from El Ray Criollo
 "Vida", a 1999 song by Rubén Blades from Tiempos
 "La Vida", song by Henry Santos
 "La Vida", song by Los Fabulosos Cadillacs Hola/Chau

People

Given name
 Vida Anim (born 1983), Ghanaian sprinter
 Vida Blue (born 1949), American baseball player
 Vida Brest (1925–1985), Slovene writer
 Vida Jane Butler (1923–2007), American radio pioneer
 Vida Chenoweth (born 1929), first solo classical marimbist
 Vida de Voss, Namibian feminist activist
 Vida Ghahremani, Iranian actress, designer and teacher
 Vida Goldstein (1869–1949), Australian feminist
 Vida Guerra (born 1974), Cuban-born glamour model
 Vida Halimian (born 1988), Iranian archer
 Vida Hope (1918–1963), British film actress
 Vida Jeraj Hribar (1902–2002), Slovenian violinist
 Vida Jeraj (1860–1932), Slovenian poet and lyricist
 Vida Jerman (1939–2011), Croatian actress
 Vida Mohammad (born 1997), Afghan model
 Vida Nsiah (born 1976), Ghanaian sprinter and hurdler
 Vida Ognjenović (born 1941), Serbian theater director, playwright and diplomat
 Vida Petrović-Škero (born 1955), Serbian Supreme Court judge
 Vida Samadzai (born 1978), Miss Afghanistan 2003
 Vida Dutton Scudder (1861–1954), American educator and welfare activist
 Vida Steinert, (1903 or 1905 - 1976), New Zealand painter

Surname
 André Vida (born 1974), American musician
 Domagoj Vida (born 1989), Croatian association football player
 Francesco Vida (1903–1984), Italian military officer and skier
 Gheza Vida (1913–1980), Romanian-Hungarian sculptor
 Giorgio Levi Della Vida (1886–1967), Italian Jewish linguist
 José Vida Soria (1937–2019), Spanish jurist and politician
 József Vida (born 1963), Hungarian hammer thrower
 Katie Vida, American interdisciplinary artist
 Marco Girolamo Vida (c. 1485–1566), Italian humanist, bishop, and poet
 Piero Vida (1938–1987), Italian film actor
 Rudika Vida, Croatian footballer
 Szabolcs Vida, Hungarian motorcycle speedway rider
 Vendela Vida (born 1971), American writer
 Viktor Vida (1913–1960), Croatian writer

Other uses 
 Vida (trade union), Austrian trade union
 Vida AB, Swedish sawmill company
 Club Deportivo y Social Vida, football team from Honduras

See also
 Vida "V" Rocca, character from Power Rangers Mystic Force
 Vidas, human given name or surname